Lawson D. Franklin (1804–1861) was an American planter, slave trader and businessman in the antebellum South. He was the first millionaire in Tennessee.

Early life
Lawson D. Franklin was born on January 19, 1804, the son of Owen Franklin and Elizabeth "Betsy" Franklin (née Roper). On his paternal side, he was a descendant of one of Benjamin Franklin's brothers.

Career
Franklin was a large landowner and businessman. He traded animals and black slaves. He funded the Bank of East Tennessee, a bank based in Rogersville, Tennessee.

Franklin became the first millionaire in Tennessee.

Personal life

Franklin married Elizabeth Rogers (1809-1846). They had three sons, Isaac W. Rodgers (1827-1866), Robert O. Franklin and Lawson D. Franklin (1841-1847), and three daughters, Elizabeth Caroline (1831-1909), Jane June and Louisa. He married a second time to Catherine Smith.

Franklin resided at the Lawson D. Franklin House in White Pine, Tennessee. He built Fairfax in White Pine for his son Isaac, and Bleak House in Knoxville, Tennessee for his daughter Louisa.

Death
Franklin died on April 8, 1861.

References

1804 births
1861 deaths
People from Jefferson County, Tennessee
American planters
American slave traders